Claudette Colvin (born Claudette Austin; September 5, 1939) is an American pioneer of the 1950s civil rights movement and retired nurse aide. On March 2, 1955, she was arrested at the age of 15 in Montgomery, Alabama, for refusing to give up her seat to a white woman on a crowded, segregated bus. This occurred nine months before the more widely known incident in which Rosa Parks, secretary of the local chapter of the National Association for the Advancement of Colored People (NAACP), helped spark the 1955 Montgomery bus boycott.

Colvin was one of four plaintiffs in the first federal court case filed by civil rights attorney Fred Gray on February 1, 1956, as Browder v. Gayle, to challenge bus segregation in the city. In a United States district court, she testified before the three-judge panel that heard the case. On June 13, 1956, the judges determined that the state and local laws requiring bus segregation in Alabama were unconstitutional. The case went to the United States Supreme Court on appeal by the state, and it upheld the district court's ruling on November 13, 1956. One month later, the Supreme Court affirmed the order to Montgomery and the state of Alabama to end bus segregation. The Montgomery bus boycott was then called off after a few months. Her brave stand sparked outrage and garnered national attention, leading to a boycott of Montgomery his boycott that lasted for over a year. Ultimately, the Supreme Court declared segregation on public transportation to be unconstitutional, thanks in part to the lawsuit Browder v. Gayle, which was filed on behalf of Colvin and three other women.

Despite her crucial role in the civil rights movement, Colvin's story is often overlooked in favor of Parks'. However, her bravery and determination continue to inspire those who fight for justice and equality. Colvin's legacy serves as a reminder of the power of individual action and the importance of standing up for what is right, even in the face of adversity.

For many years, Montgomery's black leaders did not publicize Colvin's pioneering effort. Colvin has said, "Young people think Rosa Parks just sat down on a bus and ended segregation, but that wasn't the case at all." Colvin's case was dropped by civil rights campaigners because Colvin was unmarried and pregnant during the proceedings. It is now widely accepted that Colvin was not accredited by civil rights campaigners at the time due to her circumstances. Rosa Parks stated: "If the white press got ahold of that information, they would have [had] a field day. They'd call her a bad girl, and her case wouldn't have a chance."

The record of her arrest and adjudication of delinquency was expunged by the district court in 2021, with the support of the district attorney for the county in which the charges were brought more than 66 years before.

Early life 
Claudette Colvin was born Claudette Austin in Montgomery, Alabama, on September 5, 1939, to Mary Jane Gadson and C. P. Austin. When Austin abandoned the family, Gadson was unable to financially support her children. So, Colvin and her younger sister, Delphine, were taken in by their great aunt and uncle, Mary Anne and Q. P. Colvin whose daughter, Velma Colvin, had already moved out. Colvin and her sister referred to the Colvins as their parents and took their last name. When they took Claudette in, the Colvins lived in Pine Level, a small country town in Montgomery County, the same town where Rosa Parks grew up. When Colvin was eight years old, the Colvins moved to King Hill, a poor black neighborhood in Montgomery where she spent the rest of her childhood.

Two days before Colvin's 13th birthday, Delphine died of polio. Not long after, in September 1952, Colvin started attending Booker T. Washington High School. Despite being a good student, Colvin had difficulty connecting with her peers in school due to grief. She was also a member of the NAACP Youth Council, where she formed a close relationship with her mentor, Rosa Parks.

Bus incident 
In 1955, Colvin was a student at the segregated Booker T. Washington High School in the city. She relied on the city's buses to get to and from school because her family did not own a car. The majority of customers on the bus system were African American, but they were discriminated against by its custom of segregated seating. Colvin was a member of the NAACP Youth Council and had been learning about the civil rights movement in school. On March 2, 1955, she was returning home from school. She sat in the colored section about two seats away from an emergency exit, in a Capitol Heights bus.

If the bus became so crowded that all the "white seats" in the front of the bus were filled until white people were standing, any African Americans were supposed to get up from nearby seats to make room for whites, move further to the back, and stand in the aisle if there were no free seats in that section. When a white woman who got on the bus was left standing in the front, the bus driver, Robert W. Cleere, commanded Colvin and three other black women in her row to move to the back. The other three moved, but another black woman, Ruth Hamilton, who was pregnant, got on and sat next to Colvin.

The driver looked at the women in his mirror. "He asked us both to get up. [Mrs. Hamilton] said she was not going to get up and that she had paid her fare and that she didn't feel like standing," recalls Colvin. "So I told him I was not going to get up either. So he said, 'If you are not going to get up, I will get a policeman.'" The police arrived and convinced a black man sitting behind the two women to move so that Mrs. Hamilton could move back, but Colvin still refused to move. She was forcibly removed from the bus and arrested by the two policemen, Thomas J. Ward and Paul Headley. This event took place nine months before the NAACP secretary Rosa Parks was arrested for the same offense. Colvin later said: "My mother told me to be quiet about what I did. She told me to let Rosa be the one: white people aren't going to bother Rosa, they like her". Colvin did not receive the same attention as Parks for a number of reasons: she did not have "good hair", she was not fair-skinned, she was a teenager, she was pregnant. The leaders in the Civil Rights Movement tried to keep up appearances and make the "most appealing" protesters the most seen.

When Colvin refused to get up, she was thinking about a school paper she had written that day about the local customs that prohibited blacks from using the dressing rooms in order to try on clothes in department stores. In a later interview, she said: "We couldn't try on clothes. You had to take a brown paper bag and draw a diagram of your foot ... and take it to the store". Referring to the segregation on the bus and the white woman: "She couldn't sit in the same row as us because that would mean we were as good as her".

"The bus was getting crowded, and I remember the bus driver looking through the rearview mirror asking her [Colvin] to get up for the white woman, which she didn't," said Annie Larkins Price, a classmate of Colvin. "She had been yelling, 'It's my constitutional right!'. She decided on that day that she wasn't going to move." Colvin recalled, "History kept me stuck to my seat. I felt the hand of Harriet Tubman pushing down on one shoulder and Sojourner Truth pushing down on the other." Colvin was handcuffed, arrested, and forcibly removed from the bus. She shouted that her constitutional rights were being violated. Colvin said, "But I made a personal statement, too, one that [Parks] didn't make and probably couldn't have made. Mine was the first cry for justice, and a loud one."

The police officers who took her to the station made sexual comments about her body and took turns guessing her bra size throughout the ride. Price testified for Colvin, who was tried in juvenile court. Colvin was initially charged with disturbing the peace, violating the segregation laws, and battering and assaulting a police officer. "There was no assault", Price said.

She also said in the 2009 book Claudette Colvin: Twice Towards Justice, by Phillip Hoose, that one of the police officers sat in the back seat with her. This made her very scared that they would sexually assault her because this happened frequently. A group of black civil rights leaders including Martin Luther King, Jr., was organized to discuss Colvin's arrest with the police commissioner. She was bailed out by her minister, who told her that she had brought the revolution to Montgomery.

Through the trial Colvin was represented by Fred Gray, a lawyer for the Montgomery Improvement Association (MIA), which was organizing civil rights actions. She was convicted on all three charges in juvenile court. When Colvin's case was appealed to the Montgomery Circuit Court on May 6, 1955, the charges of disturbing the peace and violating the segregation laws were dropped, although her conviction for assaulting a police officer was upheld.

Colvin's moment of activism was not solitary or random. In high school, she had high ambitions of political activity. She dreamed of becoming the President of the United States. Her political inclination was fueled in part by an incident with her schoolmate, Jeremiah Reeves; his case was the first time that she had witnessed the work of the NAACP. Reeves was found having sexual intercourse 
with a white woman who claimed she was raped, though Reeves claims their relations were consensual. He was executed for his alleged crimes.

Browder v. Gayle

Together with Aurelia S. Browder, Susie McDonald, Mary Louise Smith, and Jeanetta Reese, Colvin was one of the five plaintiffs in the court case of Browder v. Gayle. Jeanetta Reese later resigned from the case. The case, organized and filed in federal court by civil rights attorney Fred Gray, challenged city bus segregation in Montgomery as unconstitutional. During the court case, Colvin described her arrest: "I kept saying, 'He has no civil right... this is my constitutional right... you have no right to do this.' And I just kept blabbing things out, and I never stopped. That was worse than stealing, you know, talking back to a white person."

Browder v. Gayle made its way through the courts. On June 5, 1956, the United States District Court for the Middle District of Alabama issued a ruling declaring the state of Alabama and Montgomery's laws mandating public bus segregation as unconstitutional. State and local officials appealed the case to the United States Supreme Court. The Supreme Court summarily affirmed the District Court decision on November 13, 1956. One month later, the Supreme Court declined to reconsider, and on December 20, 1956, the court ordered Montgomery and the state of Alabama to end bus segregation permanently.

The Montgomery bus boycott was able to unify the people of Montgomery, regardless of educational background or class.

Life after activism 
Colvin gave birth to a son, Raymond, in March 1956. Colvin left Montgomery for New York City in 1958, because she had difficulty finding and keeping work following her participation in the federal court case that overturned bus segregation. Similarly, Rosa Parks left Montgomery for Detroit in 1957. Colvin stated she was branded a troublemaker by many in her community. She withdrew from college, and struggled in the local environment.

In New York, Colvin and her son Raymond initially lived with her older sister, Velma Colvin. In 1960, she gave birth to her second son, Randy. Claudette began a job in 1969 as a nurse's aide in a nursing home in Manhattan. She worked there for 35 years, retiring in 2004. Raymond Colvin died in 1993 in New York of a heart attack at age 37. Her son Randy is an accountant in Atlanta and father of Colvin's four grandchildren.

Legacy
Colvin was a predecessor to the Montgomery bus boycott movement of 1955, which gained national attention. But she rarely told her story after moving to New York City. The discussions in the black community began to focus on black enterprise rather than integration, although national civil rights legislation did not pass until 1964 and 1965. NPR's Margot Adler has said that black organizations believed that Rosa Parks would be a better figure for a test case for integration because she was an adult, had a job, and had a middle-class appearance. They felt she had the maturity to handle being at the center of potential controversy.

Colvin was not the only woman of the Civil Rights Movement who was left out of the history books. In the south, male ministers made up the overwhelming majority of leaders. This was partially a product of the outward face the NAACP was trying to broadcast and partially a product of the women fearing losing their jobs, which were often in the public school system.

In 2005, Colvin told the Montgomery Advertiser that she would not have changed her decision to remain seated on the bus: "I feel very, very proud of what I did," she said. "I do feel like what I did was a spark and it caught on." "I'm not disappointed. Let the people know Rosa Parks was the right person for the boycott. But also let them know that the attorneys took four other women to the Supreme Court to challenge the law that led to the end of segregation."

On May 20, 2018, Congressman Joe Crowley honored Colvin for her lifetime commitment to public service with a Congressional Certificate and an American flag.

Recognition

Colvin has often said she is not angry that she did not get more recognition; rather, she is disappointed. She said she felt as if she was "getting [her] Christmas in January rather than the 25th."

Colvin and her family have been fighting for recognition for her action. In 2016, the Smithsonian Institution and its National Museum of African American History and Culture (NMAAHC) were challenged by Colvin and her family, who asked that Colvin be given a more prominent mention in the history of the civil rights movement. The NMAAHC has a section dedicated to Rosa Parks, which Colvin does not want taken away, but her family's goal is to get the historical record right, and for officials to include Colvin's part of history. Colvin was not invited officially for the formal dedication of the museum, which opened to the public in September 2016.

"All we want is the truth, why does history fail to get it right?" Colvin's sister, Gloria Laster, said. "Had it not been for Claudette Colvin, Aurelia Browder, Susie McDonald, and Mary Louise Smith, there may not have been a Thurgood Marshall, a Martin Luther King or a Rosa Parks."

In 2000, Troy State University opened a Rosa Parks Museum in Montgomery to honor the town's place in civil rights history. Roy White, who was in charge of most of the project, asked Colvin if she would like to appear in a video to tell her story, but Colvin refused. She said, "They've already called it the Rosa Parks museum, so they've already made up their minds what the story is."

Colvin's role has not gone completely unrecognized. Councilman Larkin's sister was on the bus in 1955 when Colvin was arrested. In the 2010s, Larkin arranged for a street to be named after Colvin. Later, Rev. Joseph Rembert said, "If nobody did anything for Claudette Colvin in the past why don't we do something for her right now?" He contacted Montgomery Councilmen Charles Jinright and Tracy Larkin, and in 2017, the Council passed a resolution for a proclamation honoring Colvin. March 2 was named Claudette Colvin Day in Montgomery. Mayor Todd Strange presented the proclamation and, when speaking of Colvin, said, "She was an early foot soldier in our civil rights, and we did not want this opportunity to go by without declaring March 2 as Claudette Colvin Day to thank her for her leadership in the modern day civil rights movement." Rembert said, "I know people have heard her name before, but I just thought we should have a day to celebrate her." Colvin could not attend the proclamation due to health concerns.

In 2019, a statue of Rosa Parks was unveiled in Montgomery, Alabama, and four granite markers were also unveiled near the statue on the same day to honor four plaintiffs in Browder v. Gayle, including Colvin

In 2021 Colvin applied to the family court in Montgomery County, Alabama to have her juvenile record expunged. Daryl Bailey, the District Attorney for the county, supported her motion, stating: "Her actions back in March of 1955 were conscientious, not criminal; inspired, not illegal; they should have led to praise and not prosecution". The judge ordered that the juvenile record be expunged and destroyed in December 2021, stating that Colvin's refusal had "been recognized as a courageous act on her behalf and on behalf of a community of affected people".

In culture 

Former US Poet Laureate Rita Dove memorialized Colvin in her poem "Claudette Colvin Goes To Work", published in her 1999 book On the Bus with Rosa Parks; folk singer John McCutcheon turned this poem into a song, which was first publicly performed in Charlottesville, Virginia's Paramount Theater in 2006.

Young adult book Claudette Colvin: Twice Toward Justice, by Phillip Hoose, was published in 2009 and won the National Book Award for Young People's Literature.

A re-enactment of Colvin's resistance is portrayed in a 2014 episode of the comedy TV series Drunk History about Montgomery, Alabama. She was played by Mariah Iman Wilson.

In the second season (2013) of the HBO drama series The Newsroom, the lead character, Will McAvoy (played by Jeff Daniels), uses Colvin's refusal to comply with segregation as an example of how "one thing" can change everything. He remarks that if the ACLU had used her act of civil disobedience, rather than that of Rosa Parks' eight months later, to highlight the injustice of segregation, a young preacher named Dr. Martin Luther King Jr. may never have attracted national attention, and America probably would not have had his voice for the Civil Rights Movement.

The Little-Known Heroes: Claudette Colvin, a children's picture book by Kaushay and Spencer Ford, was published in 2021.

In 2022, a biopic of Colvin titled Spark written by Niceole R. Levy and directed by Anthony Mackie was announced.

See also
 Aurelia Browder
 Keys v. Carolina Coach Co.
 List of civil rights leaders
 Susie McDonald
 Montgomery bus boycott
 Irene Morgan
 E. D. Nixon
 Mary Louise Smith
 Viola White
 Dovey Johnson Roundtree

References

Further reading
 Phillip Hoose. Farrar, Straus and Giroux (BYR), Claudette Colvin, Twice Toward Justice. (2009). .
Taylor Branch. New York, Simon & Schuster Paperbacks, Parting The Waters - American in the King Years 1954-63. (1988). .

External links

 The Other Rosa Parks (Colvin interview with Democracy Now!)
 She had a Dream
 Daybreak of Freedom: The Montgomery Bus Boycott (Preface)
 Daybreak of Freedom: The Montgomery Bus Boycott (Excerpt)
 "Browder v. Gayle: The Women Before Rosa Parks", Tolerance
 Vanessa de la Torre, "In The Shadow of Rosa Parks: 'Unsung Hero' of Civil Rights Movement Speaks Out", The Cardinal Inquirer, January 20, 2005
 "She Would not be Moved", The Guardian
 "An asterisk, not a star, of black history", Pulsejournal
 Let us Look at Jim Crow for the Criminal he is - Rosa Parks' bus stand and the long history of bus resistance The Rebellious Life of Mrs. Rosa Parks, Rosa Parks Biography by Jeanne Theoharis, Say Burgin, and Jessica Murray, City University of New York

1939 births
Living people
Activists from Montgomery, Alabama
Activists for African-American civil rights
American child activists
Youth activists
Montgomery bus boycott
Protests in Alabama
African-American activists